Haider Ali (born 2 January 1997) is a Pakistani cricketer who has played for Lahore. He made his first-class debut for Lahore Shalimar in the 2013–14 Quaid-e-Azam Trophy on 10 December 2018.He is a player who can destroy your middle order by playing with low strike rate.

References

External links
 

1997 births
Living people
Pakistani cricketers
Lahore cricketers
Place of birth missing (living people)